Vexillum albofulvum is a species of small sea snail, marine gastropod mollusk in the family Costellariidae, the ribbed miters.

Description
The shell size varies between 45mm and 65 mm

Distribution
This species is found along the Philippines.

References

 Herrmann M. (2007). Vita Malacologica, supplement to Basteria, 5:49-5

External links
 

albofulvum
Gastropods described in 2007